The Popular Revolutionary Resistance Organization – PRRO (Arabic: التنظيم الثوري للمقاومة الشعبية transliteration Al-Tanzim al-Thawri lil-Muqawama al-Sha'abiyah) or Organisation de la Resistance Populaire Révolutionnaire (OPPR) in French, was a Phoenicist-oriented, anti-Syrian Lebanese Christian underground terrorist group that emerged in March 1987, being responsible for a single combined bomb-and-rocket attack on a West Beirut hotel.  Four residing Syrian intelligence officials were wounded in the course of action, and although the group warned of forthcoming attacks, little was heard of them since.  It has been suggested that the PRRO was simply a cover for the Lebanese Liberation Front or a splinter faction, but is now considered to be inactive.

See also 
 Guardians of the Cedars
 Lebanese civil war
 Lebanese Forces (Militia)
 Lebanese Liberation Front
 Liberation Battalion
 Sons of the South
 Phoenicianism

References

Edgar O'Ballance, Civil War in Lebanon, 1975-92, Palgrave Macmillan, London 1998. 
 Rex Brynen, Sanctuary and Survival: the PLO in Lebanon, Boulder: Westview Press, Oxford 1990.  – 
Robert Fisk, Pity the Nation: Lebanon at War, London: Oxford University Press, (3rd ed. 2001).

Further reading

 Jean Sarkis, Histoire de la guerre du Liban, Presses Universitaires de France - PUF, Paris 1993.  (in French)
 Samir Kassir, La Guerre du Liban: De la dissension nationale au conflit régional, Éditions Karthala/CERMOC, Paris 1994.  (in French)

Factions in the Lebanese Civil War
Israeli–Lebanese conflict